The Academy of Country Music Awards, also known as the ACM Awards, were first held in 1966, honoring the industry's accomplishments during the previous year. It was the first country music awards program held by a major organization. The academy's signature "hat" trophy was first created in 1968. The awards were first televised in 1972 on ABC. In 1979, the academy joined with Dick Clark Productions to produce the show. Dick Clark and Al Schwartz served as producers while Gene Weed served as director. Under their guidance, the show moved to NBC in 1979, then to CBS in 1998, and Amazon Prime Video in 2022.

The academy adopted a sleeker, modern version of the "hat" trophy in 2003, which is now made by the New York City firm Society Awards. In 2004, the organization implemented online awards voting for its professional members, becoming the first televised awards show to do so. Entertainer of the Year was a fan-voted award for eight years, until 2016, when the ACM announced its decision to abandon Internet-voting for it and the three new-artist categories.

The 57th ACM awards were presented at Allegiant Stadium in Las Vegas on March 7, 2022. The 58th ACM awards will be presented at the Ford Center in Frisco, Texas on May 11, 2023.

Voting process 
Voting members of the Academy of Country Music (ACM) elect the nominees. In 2016, after an eight-year experiment intended to improve consumer engagement, the ACM announced its decision to abandon fan-voting for Entertainer of the Year and its three new-artist categories, thanks to the cost of participation and several rifts that had developed among artists. The program was controversial from the start and included the web ballot stuffing encouragement infamous among awards of the same type presented in other ceremonies. Kenny Chesney, after winning the first fan vote for entertainer in 2008, criticized the process backstage, complaining that instead of acknowledging artists' hard work, the vote had devolved into a marketing contest that rewarded people for "seeing how hard you can push people's buttons on the Internet." The winner, for example, of entertainer will now be voted on by the same people who select the male or female vocalist winner.

Awards
The most prestigious awards are for "Artist of the Decade" and "Entertainer of the Year." There are a number of other awards to recognize male and female vocalists, albums, videos, songs, and musicians. The awards are typically presented in April or May and recognize achievement for the previous year.

Future ceremonies

The 58th Academy of Country Music awards will take place on May 11, 2023, at the Ford Center in Frisco, Texas.

Major awards

Source:

Special awards

Artist of the Decade
 2010s: Jason Aldean (presented 2019)
 2000s: George Strait (presented 2009)
 1990s: Garth Brooks (presented 1999)
 1980s: Alabama (presented 1989)
 1970s: Loretta Lynn (presented 1979)
 1960s: Marty Robbins (presented 1969)

Triple-Crown Award
The Triple-Crown Award is an elite honor that has been presented to only seven country acts in the history of the Academy of Country Music Awards. The honor distinguishes the achievement of an artist, duo or group upon receiving the New Artist (or New Male Vocalist, New Female Vocalist, New Solo Vocalist, New Vocal Duo, New Vocal Group or New Vocal Duo or Group), and Male/Female Vocalist (or Vocal Duo, Vocal Group, Vocal Duo or Group) and Entertainer of the Year awards. Among the later recipients, Carrie Underwood received it at the ACM Awards, while Jason Aldean received his at the Annual ACM Honors. The following list shows the artists that have won the award and the first year winning each of the categories required. Three artists: Miranda Lambert, The Chicks and Keith Urban, have reached the milestones needed to receive the award but they have not yet been awarded.

Kenny Chesney (presented 2005)
Top New Male Vocalist: 1998
Top Male Vocalist: 2003
Entertainer of the Year: 2005

Merle Haggard (presented 2005)
Top New Male Vocalist: 1966
Top Male Vocalist: 1967
Entertainer of the Year: 1971

Mickey Gilley (presented 2005)
Top New Male Vocalist: 1975
Top Male Vocalist: 1977
Entertainer of the Year: 1977

Barbara Mandrell (presented 2005)
Top New Female Vocalist: 1972
Top Female Vocalist: 1979
Entertainer of the Year: 1981

Brooks & Dunn (presented 2005)
Top New Vocal Duet or Group: 1992
Top Vocal Duet: 1992
Entertainer of the Year: 1996

Carrie Underwood (presented 2010)
Top New Female Vocalist: 2006
Top Female Vocalist: 2007
Entertainer of the Year: 2009

Jason Aldean (presented 2016)
Top New Male Vocalist: 2006
Top Male Vocalist: 2013
Entertainer of the Year: 2016

Miranda Lambert (to be presented 2022)
Top New Female Vocalist: 2007
Top Female Vocalist: 2010
Entertainer of the Year: 2022

Venues
The Academy of Country Music Awards were originally held at various locations in Greater Los Angeles through 2002. In 2003, the ceremony moved to Las Vegas, first at the Mandalay Bay Events Center through 2005 and later at the MGM Grand Garden Arena from 2006 to 2014. In 2015, the ceremony was held at AT&T Stadium in Arlington, Texas, in the Dallas–Fort Worth metroplex in 2015 to celebrate its 50th anniversary. The ceremony broke the Guinness record that year for Most Attended Awards Show, with 70,252 attending.

The ceremony returned to the MGM Grand Garden Arena for 2016, then moved to T-Mobile Arena in Las Vegas for 2017. In 2018 and 2019, the show was again broadcast from the MGM Grand Garden Arena. In 2020 and 2021, the in-person ceremony in Las Vegas was not held due to the COVID-19 pandemic; the two ceremonies were held at various sites in Nashville, with the primary venues being the Grand Ole Opry House, Ryman Auditorium, and the Bluebird Café.

The ACM confirmed a return to Las Vegas for 2022, with the ceremony scheduled to be held at Allegiant Stadium.

Broadcasting 
The ACM Awards were previously broadcast by ABC from 1972 to 1978, on NBC from 1979 to 1997, and CBS from 1998 to 2021. In June 2021, it was reported that CBS would not renew its contract to air the ceremony, citing declining viewership and demands from Dick Clark Productions for a higher rights fee. CBS parent company ViacomCBS had also chosen to prioritize its own CMT Music Awards (run by its cable network CMT) as a competitor, announcing later that month that it would be moved to CBS and held in April beginning 2022. After reports that the ACMs were being shopped to other networks such as NBC, it was announced on August 19, 2021, that the ceremony had been acquired by Amazon Prime Video, making it one of the first major awards ceremonies on U.S. television to move exclusively to subscription video on demand (SVOD).

See also

Country Music Association
Country Music Hall of Fame
Grand Ole Opry

References

External links
Academy of Country Music – Official Website

 
Awards established in 1966
American annual television specials
1966 establishments in the United States